Mei Foo is a Hong Kong MTR station located in Mei Foo Sun Chuen, Lai Chi Kok, New Kowloon. Mei Foo station's colour is blue.

The Tsuen Wan line part of the station is a simple through station with a central island platform, located under Mount Sterling Mall, a pedestrian-only street between the rows of residential buildings in the Mei Foo Sun Chuen housing estate. The station is designed to facilitate transport needs of the residents of Mei Foo Sun Chuen housing estate, there are 132 buildings and several schools, and the point of transfer between the Kowloon urban area and the new town of Tsuen Wan. If there is heavy traffic on the main road into urban Kowloon, the Kwai Chung Road, many commuters get off their buses and use this station as their link to Kowloon and Central on Hong Kong Island.

Layout 
Both Tsuen Wan line platforms share the same island platform. The concourses for these platforms are a five- to ten-minute walk along a connecting passageway.

Although the Tuen Ma line platform is constructed at ground level, like Nam Cheong station, the station and surrounding track is sealed to avoid disturbance to the colocated park.

Entrances/exits
A: Broadway
B: Mount Sterling Mall
C1: Lai Wan Road
C2: Humbert Street 
D: Lai Chi Kok Park (Lai Wan Road)
E: Lai Wan Road 
F: Lai Chi Kok Park 
G: Lai King Hill Road

History

The station's original name was Lai Chi Kok during the planning stage, but upon its opening on 17 May 1982 the station was called "Lai Wan" (荔灣, short for Lai Chi Kok Bay), and was renamed to its current name on 31 May 1985 when  opened.

The  (then known as KCR West Rail) part of the station was opened on 20 December 2003 along with the rail line. The station is located in the middle of Lai Chi Kok Park, slightly to the west of the Tsuen Wan line's part of the station. The scenery of the park was greatly destroyed during the construction of the station, but the park was subsequently rebuilt over the station complex. The  and West Rail line stations merged into one station on 2 December 2007 in the MTR–KCR merger.

Hence, Mei Foo was included in the project and is now an intermediate station on the Tuen Ma line.

References

Lai Chi Kok
MTR stations in Kowloon
Tsuen Wan line
West Rail line
Railway stations in Hong Kong opened in 1982
Former Kowloon–Canton Railway stations
1982 establishments in Hong Kong